The Elkhart County Miracle was a planned independent professional baseball team based in Elkhart, Indiana. 

Originally set to be a charter member of the newly resurrected Northern League of Professional Baseball, the Miracle was set to play in 2014 following the construction of a stadium located at the former American Countryside Farmer's Market site in Elkhart.

As of mid-2014, stadium construction delays ended any chance of Elkhart fielding a team for that season. In October 2014, team president and founder Craig Wallin said that a 2015 start was also doubtful, but remained confident the stadium would be built and the Miracle would take the field.

Ultimately, the Northern League of Professional Baseball was never resurrected, meaning the Elkhart County Miracle never came to fruition.

References

External links
 Official team Facebook
 Northern League official website

Northern League (baseball, 1993–2010)
2013 establishments in Indiana
Baseball teams established in 2013
Elkhart, Indiana
Defunct baseball teams in Indiana
Baseball teams disestablished in 2013
2013 disestablishments in Indiana